San Lorenzo is a comune (municipality) in the Province of Reggio Calabria in the Italian region Calabria, located about  southwest of Catanzaro and about  southeast of Reggio Calabria.

San Lorenzo borders the following municipalities: Bagaladi, Condofuri, Melito di Porto Salvo, Montebello Ionico, Roccaforte del Greco.

References

Cities and towns in Calabria